The Jász-Nagykun-Szolnok County constituency no. 3 was one of the single member constituencies of the National Assembly, the national legislature of Hungary. The district was established in 1990, when the National Assembly was re-established with the end of the communist dictatorship. It was abolished in 2011.

Members
The constituency was first represented by István Halász of the Hungarian Democratic Forum (MDF) from 1990 to 1994. Imre Iváncsik of the Hungarian Socialist Party (MSZP) was elected in 1994 and served until 2002. Lajosné Botka of the MSZP was elected in 2002, and re-elected in 2006. In the 2010 election, Ferenc Szalay of Fidesz was elected representative.

Election result

1990 election

References

Jasz-Nagykun-Szolnok 3rd